Biggar railway station served the town of Biggar, South Lanarkshire, Scotland from 1860 to 1950 on the Symington, Biggar and Broughton Railway.

History 
The station was opened on 5 November 1860 by the Symington, Biggar and Broughton Railway. It was enlarged in 1906 to coincide with the Royal Highland Show in Peebles. A second track was laid, which meant that a footbridge and a second platform were built as well as a waiting room. The goods yard later formed part of Cuthbertson's engineering works. The station was closed on 5 June 1950, although it continued to be used for schools until 14 August of the same year.

References

External links 

Disused railway stations in South Lanarkshire
Former Caledonian Railway stations
Railway stations in Great Britain opened in 1860
Railway stations in Great Britain closed in 1950
1860 establishments in Scotland
1950 disestablishments in Scotland
Biggar, South Lanarkshire